The 1867 Connecticut gubernatorial election was held on April 1, 1867. It was a rematch of the 1866 Connecticut gubernatorial election. Democratic nominee James E. English defeated incumbent governor, former Civil War general and Republican nominee Joseph Roswell Hawley with 50.52% of the vote.

As this was held shortly after the end of American Civil War, some aspects of the National Union Party were still present. The Republican convention held in New Haven on January 25 still sometimes referred to itself as the "Union Republican" convention. All references to the National Union label were dropped by the end of the 1860s.

General election

Candidates
Major party candidates

James E. English, Democratic
Joseph Roswell Hawley, Republican/National Union

Results

References

1867
Connecticut
Gubernatorial